Cryptosiphum is a genus of true bugs belonging to the family Aphididae.

The species of this genus are found in Europe.

Species:
Cryptosiphum artemisiae Buckton, 1879

References

Aphididae